Florence La Caze Gould (1 July 1895 – 28 February 1983) was American writer and salon-holder who became involved in a money laundering plot before creating a legacy as a patron of the arts at institutions such as the Metropolitan Museum of Art. She held  a salon under the Nazi Occupation of Paris entertaining Nazi officers, and narrowly escaped high treason charges in 1945.

Personal life 
Florence La Caze was born in America to French parents; her father was Maximilien Lacaze, a French publisher. She married once. Her second marriage was as the third wife of Frank Jay Gould in 1923.

Fortune and notoriety 
Gould hosted salons in their French residence through the 1920s, as she and her husband collected French Impressionist paintings. They also kept an open marriage, which allowed her to take lovers such as Charlie Chaplin.

The couple owned a gambling casino and several hotels and restaurants. These allowed them to move money from Nazis, which caused her to be charged but never found guilty of treason by the US government.

She also founded the following prizes:

 the Critics Prize
 The Max Jacob Poetry Prize
 The Roger Nimier Prize for literature
 The Engraving Prize and the Musical Composition Prize

References 

1895 births
1983 deaths
French socialites
American salon-holders
20th-century American philanthropists
American people of French descent